The Iyalode is a high-ranking female chieftain in most of the Yoruba traditional states. The title is currently within the gift of the obas, although Njoku asserted in 2002 that the process of choosing an Iyalode in pre-colonial Nigeria was less of a choice by the monarch, and more of the accomplishment and involvement of the woman to be so honoured in economic and political matters.

History
Historically, therefore, the Iyalode did not only serve as a representative of women in the council, but also as a political and economic influencer in precolonial and colonial Nigeria.

Referred to in  Yoruba mythology as Oba Obirin or "King of the Women", an Iyalode's views are normally considered in the decision-making process by the council of high chiefs. In 2017, Olatunji from Tai Solarin University of Education likened the role played by an Iyalode to that of modern day feminism. He went further by explaining that a 19th century Iyalode, Madam Tinubu, was one of the richest people in Yorubaland, and served as a major player in who became king in both 
Lagos - where she married an oba - and Egbaland - where she contributed to the war effort of her fellow Egbas. 

Mosadomi opined that the influence of the Iyalode has never been limited to being just among the women, but transcends her official duties and includes the entire political, cultural and religious structure of the Yoruba people, citing Tinubu and Efunsetan Aniwura as obvious examples. Sofola (1991) corroborates this by stating that "No matter how powerful an Oba may be, he can never be an Iyalode". According to Professor Olasupo, the authority of the Iyalode title in modern Nigeria is not as extensive as it once was. An Alaafin of Oyo, Lamidi Adeyemi, identified cultural extinction caused by "modernity" as reasons for the development. He recalled that women had more important roles in the leadership circle of Yorubaland in the past. For example, Tinubu is reported to have wielded so much power that she stopped the Oba of Lagos from making Lagos a British colony for a period.

See also
 Erelu Kuti
 Iyoba
 Queen mothers in Africa

References 

Yoruba words and phrases
Women in Nigeria
Yoruba politics
Noble titles
African traditional governments
African noble titles